John Fisher (born 21 December 1947) is a Scotland-born Canadian former professional ice hockey player.

Early life 
Fisher was born in Ayr, Scotland, but played his junior hockey in Canada with the Moose Jaw Canucks and the St. Catharines Black Hawks.

Career 
Fisher played the majority of his career with teams in the minor professional leagues (CHL, IHL, EHL). He played 40 games with the Alberta Oilers of the World Hockey Association during the league's inaugural 1972–73 season.

Career statistics

References

External links

1947 births
Living people
Dallas Black Hawks players
Edmonton Oilers (WHA) players
Fort Worth Wings players
Greensboro Generals (EHL) players
Nashville Dixie Flyers players
Sportspeople from Ayr
Port Huron Wings players
St. Catharines Black Hawks players
Scottish ice hockey centres
Scottish emigrants to Canada